Michael McDowell is the name of:

Michael McDowell (politician) (born 1951), barrister and an Irish politician
Michael McDowell (actor), Northern Irish actor
Michael McDowell (author) (1950–1999), American novelist and screenwriter
Michael P. Kube-McDowell (born 1954), American science fiction writer
Michael McDowell (racing driver) (born 1984), American race car driver
Mike MacDowel (1932–2016), English racing driver